Asanoa siamensis is a bacterium from the genus Asanoa which has been isolated from soil from the peat swamp forest from the Phu Sang National Park, Thailand.

References 

Micromonosporaceae
Bacteria described in 2013